Lutz Hoffmann (30 January 1959 – 5 December 1997) was an East German gymnast and Olympic silver medalist.

Early life and training
He began gymnastics training at the age of five. Beginning in 1976, he trained with the SC Dynamo Berlin. His younger brother Ulf Hoffmann was likewise an Olympic gymnast. In their youth, they shared a boarding school room during their time with SC Synamo Berlin.

Career
In 1979 Hoffmann became GDR champion in the floor exercise and finished second in the vault. At the world championships in the same year his team finished fourth. Next year they won a silver medal at the 1980 Summer Olympics in Moscow. At those games, Hoffmann was seventh all-around and sixth on the floor. He won a bronze medal in the parallel bars at the 1981 European championships.

Later life and death
After retiring from competitions he worked as gymnastics coach and then became a teacher in Bad Sachsa, Germany, where he committed suicide in 1997.

References

External links
 
 

1959 births
1997 suicides
People from Weißenfels
People from Bezirk Halle
German male artistic gymnasts
Sportspeople from Saxony-Anhalt
Olympic gymnasts of East Germany
Gymnasts at the 1980 Summer Olympics
Olympic silver medalists for East Germany
Olympic medalists in gymnastics
Medalists at the 1980 Summer Olympics
Recipients of the Patriotic Order of Merit in bronze
Suicides in Germany
20th-century German people